Ziah Town was a  small town in Grand Gedeh County in southeastern Liberia and serves as the administrative seat of Konobo District. Majority of the residents are ethnic Krahn and many use its language on a daily basis. it is a city now with about 3000 plus people living there from : konobo, Glio,Twabo putu and sometimes Glaro( the area used to be part of grand Gedeh county now River Gee)

References

Populated places in Liberia
Grand Gedeh County